Man Facing Southeast is a 1986 Argentine science fiction drama film written and directed by Eliseo Subiela, starring Lorenzo Quinteros and Hugo Soto.

The film was selected as the Argentine entry for the Best Foreign Language Film at the 60th Academy Awards, but was not accepted as a nominee.

The themes and story of the 2001 American film K-PAX share a strong resemblance with Man Facing Southeast, and the former has been referenced or claimed as an uncredited remake of the latter.

In a survey of the 100 greatest films of Argentine cinema carried out by the Museo del Cine Pablo Ducrós Hicken in 2000, the film reached the 10th position. In a new version of the survey organized in 2022 by the specialized magazines La vida útil, Taipei and La tierra quema, presented at the Mar del Plata International Film Festival, the film reached the 40th position. Also in 2022, the film was included in Spanish magazine Fotogramass list of the 20 best Argentine films of all time.

Plot 

The staff and patients go about their daily business at Buenos Aires' José Borda Psychiatric Hospital on a summer day in 1985. A staff psychiatrist, Dr. Julio Denis (Lorenzo Quinteros) is surprised to hear that his ward for non-violent delusional cases has one patient too many. Denis finds the patient in the chapel playing the organ like a virtuoso. Summoning him (Hugo Soto) to his office, Denis finds the man's speech is measured and articulate as he explains his presence on Earth as a result of his image being projected from light years away. He introduces himself as "Rantés" (an exotic-sounding name in Argentina). Dr. Denis suggests that Rantés might be a fugitive hoping to hide from the law in the hospital. He lets the patient stay however, after seeing how his caring touch helps the other patients. The doctor is amused by his extraterrestrial claims and he suspects that the man is a genius using his talents as a charade.

Julio Denis is a highly professional, lonely man, whose recent divorce left him jaded towards his life and work. Since his wife remarried, he settles for weekly outings with his two children and grainy home movies of happier times, which he views every night. Rantés, who starts noticing the emotionally wounded Dr. Denis, is as interested in his troubles as the doctor is in Rantés, "the first patient in a long time" that has interested him at all. Believing that Rantés' claim of being a "projected hologram" is an allusion to Adolfo Bioy Casares' classic novel Morel's Invention, Dr. Denis concludes that this impressive genius is very well-read. The doctor soon uses his prerogatives to include Rantés in several outings, including a visit to a touring Moscow State Circus performance.

Rantés is no ordinary man, though. Having a psychokinetic gift, he quickly finds ways to explore the city on his own and without permission. Compassionate to a fault, he uses this gift to the benefit of the hungry, narrowly skirting the law. He spends hours standing in one of the asylum's courtyards, completely motionless, facing southeast. He claims to do this to receive "transmissions from his planet" and even implies that he is actually Denis' own hallucination. In narration, Dr. Denis claims that he appears to be the only physician who still notices the polite, unproblematic patient, but it's clear in a subsequent scene that he is not, since the doctor gets Rantés a job in the pathology department of the hospital. Because of Rantés kindness to everyone, he quickly earns the loyalty of the other patients and Dr. Denis' growing, confused respect. The doctor is aware that Rantés has been leaving without permission and has avoided taking his medicine; nevertheless, he is impressed and he takes Rantés' requests seriously, persuading Dr. Prieto, the head of pathology, to hire him as a volunteer assistant. Prieto (Rubens Correa) admits that Rantés would be his first assistant in some time (having lost his previous assistant due to budget cuts), and that he finds Rantés extremely helpful.

Surprising everyone, Rantés is visited by an attractive young lady, Beatriz (Inés Vernengo). She and Rantés clearly know each other and Dr. Denis hopes she can shed light on his mysterious patient's identity. Dr. Denis introduces himself to Beatriz and quickly becomes attracted to her. She tells Denis of Rantés' work among children in a slum, where they met while working for an evangelical mission, and especially his devotion to a young child with superior musical abilities; beyond that, she knows him as a "very good man" whom she is only casually acquainted with. Dr. Denis is charmed by the woman and asks Rantés about her. He responds that she is very special and "a Saint".

Beatriz invites both of them to an outdoor classical concert. During the concert, captivated by the music, Rantés asks Beatriz to dance. The audience finds this amusing and exciting, and some of them decide to follow suit and also dance. Rantés becomes even more entranced by the music as the orchestra plays Beethoven's Ninth Symphony. He eventually persuades the conductor to let him take the baton for the symphony's iconic Ode to Joy, which confuses the musicians, leading to their refusing to play with him. After a few false starts with Rantés trying to conduct the orchestra, the musicians eventually decide to play as Rantés conducts them. The audience is even more amused and excited by the situation while concurrently at the asylum, the patients start to get excited and agitated and then parade the ground in a state of joy, and eventually into the town where the concert is being held. The police arrive and are about to remove Rantés from the conducting podium when the actual conductor convinces them to not remove Rantés. Rantés finishes and is arrested.

Confronted by the hospital's angry Director (David Edery), Dr. Denis is less concerned for his job than he is for his impetuous friend, whom the director orders closely monitored and strictly medicated. Dr. Denis fears this could kill Rantés' unique personality and intellect. The director is unsympathetic and states: "Instead of making the police blotter, Rantés ends up in the front page next time: LUNATIC ORDERS MILITARY ATTACK", to which Denis quickly retorts (referring to the Malvinas/Falklands War): "That already happened, and I doubt Rantés had anything to do with it!".

Affected by the medication, Rantés broods and becomes rebellious. He seems tormented by Dr. Denis' lack of involvement, asking, "Doctor, why have you abandoned me?". He is also more upset by the mistreatment of other patients. After escaping again, he demands to see the director about the awful quality of the asylum's food, but is turned away. His complaints are also rejected by the local newspaper. Dr. Denis believes that Rantés is disillusioned with mankind and may never recover, but continues the treatment. Denis convinces Beatriz to meet at his home, where they become passionate about each other and have sex. Then she confides to the doctor that she is an alien projection, like Rantés, but assures him that she now feels emotion and can love him. Denis is livid and angrily throws her out of his home while accusing her of being a lunatic "like Rantés".

After Rantés starts becoming catatonic, the Director decides to give him electroshock treatment without notifying Denis. Rantés doesn't endure anesthesia and dies from a heart attack. The rest of the patients don't believe in Rantés' death, as they all hope that he has only gone back to his ship for some time. From then on the patients keep waiting for Rantés to return and take them away to his planet. At the same time Denis, now filled with doubts and regrets about Rantés' life and his relationship with him, quietly waits for Beatriz, who is away indefinitely, to return to him.

Cast 
 Lorenzo Quinteros as Dr. Julio Denis.
 Hugo Soto as Rantés.
 Inés Vernengo as Beatriz Dick.
 Cristina Scaramuzza as Nurse.
 Tomás Voth as Young Suicidal Man.
 David Edery as Hospital Director.
 Rúbens Correa as Dr. Prieto.

Release and reception 
A modest box-office draw when released in Argentina in April 1987, Man Facing Southeast received wider acclaim upon its video release later that year. The Secretary of Culture (now the Ministry of Culture) submitted it for consideration to the Academy of Motion Pictures for the 1987 Oscar for Best Foreign Language Film, but the film never made the shortlist of nominees.

On Rotten Tomatoes, the film has a score of 86% based on reviews from 7 critics, with an average rating of 8.3 out of 10.

K-PAX controversy and influence 
Little known outside Argentina, Man Facing Southeast received wider exposure upon the 2001 release of Universal Pictures' K-PAX, whose similarity to the Argentine title (whose author and director, Eliseo Subiela, was not credited) was unmistakable to film enthusiasts and critics, among them Robert Koehler of Variety and Bob Strauss of the Los Angeles Times, both of whom expressed surprise at K-PAX author Gene Brewer's contention that Man Facing Southeast was unfamiliar to him.

Film critics at MSNBC, for their part, commented that "both films are quite similar, though Man Facing Southeast is more ingenious and enigmatic". The film was described by Mark R. Leeper as a combination of Nicolas Roeg's The Man Who Fell to Earth and Miloš Forman's One Flew Over the Cuckoo's Nest.

Other critics have highlighted the metaphoric value of Rantés, himself, whose miraculous powers, concern for the poor, frank criticism of human hypocrisy and willingness to subject himself to what amounts to torture create a character with a clear parallel in Christianity.

The 1993 American drama film Mr. Jones, directed by Mike Figgis and starring Richard Gere and Lena Olin, was partially inspired in Man Facing Southeast: in the film's story, Gere's character is a manic-depressive patient in a psychiatric institution, and in one scene the character abruptly jumps the stage at a classical music concert and conducts the orchestra. This scene was directly taken from Man Facing Southeast by Gere's own admission during an interview for Televisión Española, where he stated that the concert scene was "a homage to an Argentine film called 'Hombre mirando al Sudeste'".

See also 
 Bioy Casares, Adolfo. The Invention of Morel. (short novel; 1940)
 List of submissions to the 60th Academy Awards for Best Foreign Language Film
 List of Argentine submissions for the Academy Award for Best Foreign Language Film

Notes 
 Membrez, Nancy J. (ed.) The Cinematic Art of Eliseo Subiela, Argentine Filmmaker. Lewiston, NY: Mellen Press, 2007.

References

External links 
 
 
 
 Man Facing Southeast at Cinenacional.com 

1986 films
1980s science fiction films
1980s Spanish-language films
Films about psychiatry
Films set in psychiatric hospitals
Films set in hospitals
Psychiatric hospitals in fiction
Films set in Buenos Aires
Argentine science fiction films